Joshua Jake "Josh" Bulan Grommen (born 10 July 1996) is a professional footballer who plays as a centre back for Thai League 1 club Khon Kaen United. Born in Australia, he has represented the Philippines at the under-22 and under-23 levels.

Early life
Grommen was born in Brisbane, Australia to a Dutch father Rudy Grommen, and a Filipino mother Alma Bulan.

Career

Club
Joshua Grommen attended the Queensland Academy of Sport and was part of Brisbane Roar's National Youth League team. At age 18, Grommen moved to the Philippines due to limited playing opportunities in Australia to play for clubs including Loyola Meralco, Stallion, Ceres-Negros, and Davao Aguilas. Grommen joined Loyola Meralco of the now-defunct United Football League (UFL) in 2014 but left the club paying out his contract after getting an offer to play for Brisbane Roar. He returned to the UFL in 2015 with Stallion signing him in for the 2016 season.

He had a brief stint with Western Pride back in Australia. He joined Pride in October 2017 and made a bid to join the club's first team. After just two pre-season trial matches he left the club in January 2017 to join Ceres which were then still playing in the UFL for a chance to play in the AFC Cup. The club later won the zonal championships of the 2017 AFC Cup. He remained part of Ceres, which renamed as Ceres-Negros F.C., when the club moved to the Philippines Football League (PFL).

For the 2018 PFL season, Grommen joined the Davao Aguilas which later become defunct by the end of the season.

In early 2019, Grommen moved to Petaling Jaya City of the Malaysia Super League. He later became a free agent but through connections with fellow Filipino-Australian player Iain Ramsay managed to secure a move to Sukhothai of Thai League 1.

Grommen rejoined Ceres–Negros for the 2020 season. On 11 February, he started in Ceres' first AFC Cup group match against Cambodian champions Svay Rieng. He scored Ceres' second goal in the 14th minute, converting Stephan Schröck's cross with what looked like a header. Replays showed that Grommen used his hand to score, yet the goal was still counted in the 4–0 win for Ceres, as the referee and his assistants failed to notice the incident. In March, football tournaments in the Philippines and Asia were either suspended or cancelled due to COVID-19. Grommen then left Ceres–Negros in June and returned to Australia.

In August 2020, National Premier Leagues Queensland side Brisbane City announced that they have signed in Grommen. He made two league appearances for the team that season.

Sukhothai announced Grommen's return on 6 January 2021.

International
Grommen has played for the Philippine national youth team. He played for the Philippines in the 2016 AFC U-23 Championship qualifiers.

Career statistics

Club

Notes

References

1996 births
Living people
Filipino footballers
Association football defenders
Citizens of the Philippines through descent
Brisbane Roar FC players
Brisbane City FC players
F.C. Meralco Manila players
Stallion Laguna F.C. players
Ceres–Negros F.C. players
Davao Aguilas F.C. players
MISC-MIFA players
Joshua Grommen
Joshua Grommen
Filipino expatriate footballers
Filipino people of Dutch descent
Australian people of Dutch descent
Australian people of Filipino descent
Soccer players from Brisbane